Rongelap Airport is a public use airstrip at Rongelap on Rongelap Atoll, Marshall Islands.

Facilities 
Rongelap Airport has one runway measuring 3,950 x 100 ft (1,204 x 30 m).

Airlines and destinations

References 

Airports in the Marshall Islands